Weston Park Hospital is a health facility specialising in the treatment of cancer in Broomhill, Sheffield, South Yorkshire, England. It is managed by the Sheffield Teaching Hospitals NHS Foundation Trust.

History
The hospital has its origins in the Sheffield Radium Fund, which was established in 1914. The fund was used to create the Radium Centre in 1930 and subsequently the Sheffield National Centre for Radiotherapy in 1945. Weston Park Hospital was officially opened in April 1970.

Operation of the hospital was transferred from the Sheffield Health Authority (dissolved on 1 April 1992) to the newly-created Weston Park Hospital NHS Trust on 1 November 1991.  In April 1995, Weston Park was designated a cancer centre and the surrounding district hospitals became cancer units, based on recommendations from the Calman–Hine report, the purpose of which was to provide a uniformly high standard of care as close to the patient's home as possible.

On 1 April 1999, the Weston Park Hospital NHS Trust was merged into the existing Central Sheffield University Hospitals NHS Trust, which subsequently merged with the Northern General Hospital NHS Trust on 1 April 2001 to create the Sheffield Teaching Hospitals NHS Trust.  The Trust was awarded Foundation status on 1 July 2004.

Services
The hospital is one of four dedicated cancer centres in the United Kingdom.

Notes

See also
 Cancer in the United Kingdom

References

External links
Official site

Hospitals in Sheffield
Sheffield Teaching Hospitals NHS Foundation Trust
NHS hospitals in England
Cancer organisations based in the United Kingdom
Hospital buildings completed in 1970
Specialist hospitals in England